"Epitáfio" is the fifteenth single by Titãs, released in 2002. It was included in the soundtrack of telenovela Desejos de Mulher. As a B-side, the single featured an acoustic version of the song. Unlike the whole band, producer Jack Endino believed it could be a hit and was eventually proven right.

The music video, featuring archive footage of the Titãs in their daily lives, won three awards at the MTV Video Music Brasil, including Viewer's Choice and Video of the Year.

In December 2014, by request of TV program Fantástico, the band recorded a new version of the track with verses suggested by the program's spectators. Each suggestion described something the person felt they should have done less in 2014 or that they intend to do more in 2015, keeping the original logic of the single.

Track listing

Cover versions 
 Gal Costa on her 2002 album Gal Bossa Tropical
 Kiloucura on their 2003 album Kiloucura ao vivo
 Flávio Carvalho on his album Pra Te Enlouquecer
 Tim (from Xutos & Pontapés) on his 2006 solo album Um e o Outro
 Liv Moraes on her 2006 album Liv Moraes
 Fábio Jr on his 2008 compilation album Minha História
 Nasi (ex-Ira!) for the 2008 Rede Record telenovela Chamas da Vida

References

External links 
 

2002 singles
Titãs songs
2001 songs
Songs written by Sérgio Britto